The Kobuk River (Kuuvak in Iñupiaq) (also Kooak, Kowak, Kubuk, Kuvuk, or Putnam)
 is a river located in the Arctic region of northwestern Alaska in the United States. Topography includes low, rolling mountains, plains and lowlands, moderately high rugged mountainous land, and some gently sloped plateaus and highlands. The river contains an exceptional population of sheefish (Stenodus leucicthys), a large predatory whitefish within the salmon family, found throughout the Arctic that spawns in the river's upper reaches during the autumn. A portion of the vast Western Arctic Caribou Herd utilize the Kobuk river valley as winter range.

Course 
It is commonly assumed that the Kobuk River issues from Walker Lake. However, the headwaters of the river are to the east of Walker Lake in the Endicott Mountains within the Gates of the Arctic National Park and Preserve, just north of the Arctic Circle. It flows briefly south, descending from the mountains through two spectacular canyons (Upper and Lower Kobuk Canyon), then flows generally west along the southern flank of the western Brooks Range in a broad wetlands valley. In the valley it passes a connected community of inland native villages, including Kobuk, Shungnak, and Ambler, where it receives the Ambler River. In the river's lower reaches, where it passes between the Baird and Waring mountains, it traverses Kobuk Valley National Park, the location of the  Kobuk Sand Dunes. It then passes Kiana.  The river enters its broad delta approximately 10 miles (16 km) southwest of Kiana.  The delta is located in The Hotham Inlet of the Kotzebue Sound approximately 30 miles (48 km) southeast of Kotzebue.

History 
The Kobuk's Inuit name Kuuvak means "great river". It was first transcribed by John Simpson in 1850 as "Kowuk." Explored by Lt. G. M. Stoney, USN, in 1883–1886, who wrote the name "Ku-buck," but proposed that it be called "Putnam" in honor of Master Charles Putnam, USN, officer of the Rodgers, who was carried to sea on the ice and lost in 1880. Lt. J. C. Cantwell, USRCS, also explored the river in 1884 and 1885 and spelled the name "Koowak" on his map and "Kowak" in his text. Ivan Petroff spelled the river name "Kooak" in 1880, and W. H. Dall spelled it "Kowk" in 1870. Lt. H. T. Allen, USA, obtained the Koyukon Indian name in 1885 which he spelled "Holooatna" and "Holoatna."

Native peoples have hunted, fished, and lived along the Kobuk for at least 12,500 years and it has long been an important transportation route for inland peoples. In 1898 the river was the scene of a brief gold rush called the Kobuk River Stampede, which involved about 2,000 prospectors in total. Hearing of gold along the Kobuk and its tributaries, miners set out from Seattle and San Francisco on ships to reach the mouth of the Kobuk. Upon arrival they were informed by native people that it was a scam, and only about 800 traveled upriver. The result was that little or no gold was found, and only on a few tributaries of the river. In 1980 the United States Congress designated  of the river downstream from Walker Lake as the Kobuk Wild and Scenic River as part of the National Wild and Scenic Rivers System. The river is considered an outstanding destination for recreational floating.

Climate 
The Kobuk River Basin is located just north of the Arctic Circle and has a continental climate. The summers are short and warm, while winters are long and cold. The mean annual temperature in the middle and upper portions of the Kobuk Valley is -6 °C, and the mean temperature in July is 15 °C. An average of 21 inches (53 cm) of precipitation falls in the basin. However, actual precipitation can range from 15 to 40 inches (40–100 cm) with greater amounts falling in the upper reaches of the river basin.

The Kobuk River Basin is very sensitive to changes in climate. Arctic climates have warmed at approximately twice the global rate in the last several decades. Records of air-temperature from 1961 to 1990 logged at the latitudes of the Kobuk River, show a warming trend of about 1.4 °F (0.78 °C) per decade. The warming has been the strongest in the winter and spring months. Climate change is presently considered the most severe environmental stress in the Kobuk River Basin and throughout Alaska.

As a specific example, climate change will cause widespread thawing of permafrost in the discontinuous zone and significant changes in the continuous zone.  Thawing permafrost can lead to a landscape of irregular depressions (thermokarst) due to subsiding soils.  This can alter drainage patterns and even change the course of streams; whereas other areas could become swamp-like.  In addition, slope stability will decrease and permafrost degradation could lead to erosion of river banks resulting in an increase in sediment transport by the rivers.  These physical changes will impact nutrient cycling and biological processes within the basin as well.

Geology and soils 

Permafrost regions along the Kobuk River are shown in the accompanying figure.

Geomorphology 

The Kobuk River is a periglacial river, fed by a remnant glacial lake (Walker Lake) and mountain snowmelt in the Brooks Range. It cuts a channel through a landscape otherwise dominated by permafrost. The Kobuk's current form and structure is a direct result of several stages of erosion and channel formation following the last glacial retreat.

As the glacier first retreated and melted, large amounts of highly erodible, fine-grained sediment dropped out in relatively high mountain valleys. The availability of this fine-grained, loose sediment combined with a high gradient to turn a newly forming Kobuk River into a fast-working sediment transport system. The river picked up glacial till from its upper reaches and transported it downstream until the gradient diminished. When the river encountered flatter ground, it deposited its sediment load resulting in the creation of broad, flat floodplains, alluvial fans, and meander bends through aggradation.

After the first stage of aggradation and sediment transport, the Kobuk began a new phase of erosion and landform development. The river exhausted its supply of easily erodible sediment upstream, thus decreasing its sediment load and increasing its load carrying capacity downstream. With more capacity downstream, the river began to incise into the alluvial fan it previously created, moving sediment stored for a long time on its original floodplains to newer floodplains even further downstream.

Further down in the Kobuk watershed, the river worked in concert with the wind to create one of the more famous landforms in Alaska: the Kobuk Dunes. These large sand dunes are the modern ancestor of alluvial deposits that became shaped and dominated by an exchange of aeolian and fluvial processes. In moister climates, the river has more water, and thus more power, and cuts down through a sandy bed. In times of drier climate, wind dominates and blows a lot of sediment into a weaker fluvial system, leading to aggradation and floodplain re-distribution.

Currently, the Kobuk River in its middle and lower reaches is an anastomizing stream, with several braided channels in places, wide migrating meander bends, and oxbow lakes. It is controlled by yearly cycles of freeze and thaw, much like its surrounding landscape. For six months of the year, the river is largely still, frozen on top by a thick layer of ice. In the spring, warmer temperatures cause this ice to begin to melt. But the resulting process is not gradual. Rather, the pressure of melting ice from upstream builds up upon ice "dams" in the river's channel, eventually causing an "ice break-up" event, in which a flood of ice and water moves powerfully downstream.

These annual spring break-up events have several important consequences. First, the river has deeply undercut and eroded banks, caused by large, fast-moving chunks of ice carving out the river's channel before it begins spilling out onto its floodplain, which is 1 to 6 miles (1.6-9.7 km) wide except at the confluence of major tributaries. Second, the river moves laterally very quickly and dramatically, re-inventing side channels every year as its secondary streams become drowned in each yearly flood by an overwhelming amount of sediment. Lastly, since the river is surrounded mostly by permafrost and because during the spring break-up event there are still large parts of frozen ground close to its banks, floods often transports large amounts of fine sediment across broad expanses of floodplain in thin sheets of water that slide easily across the frozen ground.  These characteristics also translate into a relatively variable habitat for the Kobuk's native species.

Farthest west, the Kobuk empties into Hotham Inlet, the easterly arm of Kotzebue Sound.  During recent geologic times however, when sea level was lower, the Noatak, Kobuk, and Selawik Rivers were joined. Now, they have separate deltas with many lakes and swamps and intricately webbed channel systems.  The deltas are composed primarily of silt, sand, and gravel.

Surface water and hydrology 

The Kobuk River is ice covered 6 months of the year  and in general, late October to late May is a period of relatively low flow. Annually, the hydrograph reflects two flood peaks: the first is associated with spring break-up and the second, a lesser peak, is associated with late summer precipitation. As the snowpack begins to melt toward the end of May, flow in the Kobuk River increases with most of the runoff occurring during June. Flow during the summer (July through September) is dominated by variable precipitation events.

Most of the major tributaries of the Kobuk River flow from the north, draining the mountains in the southern Brooks Range. From east to west, these include the Reed River, Beaver Creek, Mauneluk River, Kogoluktuk River, Shungnak River, Ambler River, Akillik River, Tutuksuk River, Salmon River, and the Squirrel River. Within Kobuk Valley National Park, are the Kallarichuk, Kaliguricheark, and Adillik rivers. All of their headwaters are in the Baird Mountains. The major tributaries flowing north from the Waring Mountains are the Pah River, Pick River, and Niaktuvik Creek. The Pah River drains a lowland area of the basin. Most major tributaries draining high relief areas have higher unit runoff than tributaries draining the lower relief areas.

Other surface water features within the basin include Lake Selby, Nutuvukti Lake, and Norutak Lake. Additionally, numerous small lakes and ponds occur in the lowlands along the river, some formed as detached oxbows of the meandering river and others formed where permafrost has melted and caused depressions.

Flow records are available from USGS monitoring stations at Ambler and Kiana. Peak flows can result from large volumes of water released when ice jams fail. Flow records are also available for Dahl Creek, a tributary of the Kobuk River with a confluence near the town of Kobuk.

See also 
 List of rivers of Alaska
 List of National Wild and Scenic Rivers
 Kobuk River Stampede

References

External links 
 Alaska fish and game species descriptions
 Kobuk Valley National Park
 Gates of the Arctic National Park
 List of birds observed at Selby Lake in the Middle Kobuk River basin
 Kobuk Wild and Scenic River
 Kobuk River Stampede
 Kobuk, Alaska
 Alaska Department of Natural Resources Kobuk Area Map (big file)

Rivers of Northwest Arctic Borough, Alaska
Rivers of Alaska
Wild and Scenic Rivers of the United States
Gates of the Arctic National Park and Preserve
Kobuk Valley National Park
Brooks Range